

2013–14 statistics

Squad information

 

Total squad cost: €5.775.000

Disciplinary record
Includes all competitive matches. The list is sorted by position, and then shirt number.

Transfers

In 

Total expenditure:

Out 

 

 
 
 
 

Total income:

Competitions

Pre-season

Mid-season

Overall

League table

Results summary

Results by round

Matches

Kup Bosne i Hercegovine

Round of 32

UEFA Champions League

Second qualifying round

References

FK Željezničar Sarajevo seasons
Zeljeznicar